Kuabeserrai is an island of Palau.

References

Uninhabited islands of Palau